Arthur Lee Irving,  (born 1930) is a Canadian billionaire businessman, the second son of industrialist K.C. Irving. He is the sole owner, through the Arthur Irving Family Trust, of  Irving Oil Ltd. As of June 2022, his net worth was estimated at US$4.2 billion.

Early and personal life
Irving was born in 1930 in Saint John, New Brunswick, Canada, the second son of industrialist K.C. Irving. He was educated at Lakefield College School and Acadia University. Irving is married, with five children, and lives in Saint John, New Brunswick, Canada.

Business interests
Following their father's death in 1992, ownership and responsibility for the Irving companies was divided as follows:

 Arthur - ownership and responsibility for Irving Oil, its retail stores, oil refineries, oil tankers and distribution terminals and other facilities.
 J.K. - ownership and responsibility for J.D. Irving, the conglomerate which has interests in forestry, pulp and paper, tissue, building supplies, frozen food, transportation, shipping lines, and shipbuilding among others.
 Jack - ownership and responsibility for construction, engineering and steel fabrication companies. Died in July 2010 at the age of 78. Succeeded by eldest son, John K. F. Irving.

All companies within the Irving conglomerate are vertically integrated and buy services and products of other Irving-owned companies, thereby maintaining profits within their operations.

Activities and awards
Irving served as Chancellor of Acadia University in Wolfville, Nova Scotia from 1996 to 2010, where he established the K.C. Irving Environmental Science Centre. In 2016, Dartmouth accepted $80 million from the Irving family to set up the Arthur L. Irving Institute for Energy and Society.

In 2002, he was made an Officer of the Order of Canada and in 2012 he was made a member of the Order of New Brunswick. In 2008, along with his brothers he was inducted into the Canadian Business Hall of Fame.

See also
 List of Canadian university leaders

References

Businesspeople from Saint John, New Brunswick
Canadian university and college chancellors
Members of the Order of New Brunswick
Officers of the Order of Canada
Canadian philanthropists
Canadian billionaires
1930 births
Living people